Kevin Hensley is a competitive swimmer from the United States Virgin Islands. He represented the Virgin Islands at the 2010 Central American and Caribbean Games, and aims to participate in the Olympics.

References

Living people
Year of birth missing (living people)
United States Virgin Islands male swimmers
Swimmers at the 2003 Pan American Games
Pan American Games competitors for the United States Virgin Islands